Craig Hignett (born 12 January 1970), is an English former professional footballer. He started his career as a striker but later moved into midfield.

Playing career
Born in Whiston and previously a trainee at Liverpool, Hignett began his senior career with Crewe Alexandra in 1988, making his debut in a goal-less Fourth Division match at Wrexham on 8 October 1988. During the 1989-1990 season, he scored his first league goal in a 3–2 defeat by Swansea City at Gresty Road on 7 October 1989, and began to make more regular appearances, notching six more goals. On 30 April 1991, he scored his first hat-trick as Crewe beat Rotherham United 3–0 at Gresty Road, and on 14 November 1992 he hit four in his penultimate club appearance as Crewe beat Wrexham 6–1 in an FA Cup first round tie, also at Gresty Road. He made 150 first team appearances for Crewe, scoring 57 goals, before being sold to Middlesbrough for £500,000 on 27 November 1992.

After the club were relegated in his first season with Middlesbrough, he helped them back up two seasons later. In 1996–97 Hignett again suffered relegation with Middlesbrough and was part of the team that lost in the FA Cup final and League Cup final the same season. He had however made sure of a place in the club's history by scoring the first goal at the Riverside Stadium, their new ground, in a 2–0 win over Chelsea at the start of 1995–96 Season.

Hignett also took a pay cut to stay at the club at one point, in stark contrast to the many big-name signings Middlesbrough were bringing in at the time. In 1998 he left Middlesbrough to sign for Aberdeen on a free transfer, having made 194 appearances and 48 goals for Boro. His stay at Aberdeen was short lived, only lasting six months, before signing for Barnsley for £800,000 in 1999.

After suffering relegation from the Premiership, Barnsley were looking for a quick return to the top flight and Hignett's 20 goals in his second season at Oakwell helped them reach the play-off final of the 1999–2000 season. Hignett scored once in the final but Barnsley lost 4–2 to Ipswich Town. It was initially thought Hignett had scored twice but the other goal was eventually attributed to an own goal by Richard Wright after Hignett's shot rebounded off the crossbar and in off Wright.

Hignett left Barnsley in 2000 after 66 appearances and 35 goals for the club; he signed for Blackburn Rovers for a fee of £2.2 million. He helped Rovers regain their Premiership status and won a League Cup winners medal when Blackburn beat Tottenham Hotspur 2–1 in the 2002 final, with Hignett coming off the bench.

However, in the 2002–03 season he only played three league games and one UEFA Cup game; Hignett was sent on loan to Coventry City halfway through the season but suffered a hairline fracture of his leg at Bramall Lane on 28 December 2002 which ended his loan spell. After returning, he scored on the final day of the season which was to prove to be his last appearance for Blackburn Rovers. He played 68 times and scored 14 goals for Rovers before being released.

In 2003, he signed for Leicester City but struggled to get in the side, making only 15 appearances before going on loan back to Crewe Alexandra at the end of the 2003–04 season and playing another 15 games. He only scored once during his time at Leicester but it was a memorable goal: a crucial injury time equaliser against Arsenal.

In 2004 he had a brief stint at Leeds United before signing for Darlington, where he scored on his debut.

In Summer 2005 he signed a contract with Apollon Limassol in Cyprus playing 12 games leading the Limassol side to its 3rd Championship as the only undefeated team in whole Europe!

On 22 March 2007, Hartlepool United signed Hignett on a short-term contract. Hignett had been training with the club and had taken part in Reserve Team fixtures prior to signing up permanently. He left the club in May 2007. He subsequently joined Billingham Synthonia, for whom he made four appearances during the 2008–09 season, scoring two goals.

In September 2007 Hignett starred in Sky1's Premier League All Stars, in which he helped Middlesbrough beat West Ham United in the final.

Managerial career

As of April 2008 he was part of the Academy coaching staff at Middlesbrough. He was linked with the Darlington job after Colin Todd was sacked, he was again rumoured after Steve Staunton was sacked. In May 2013, Hignett became assistant manager at Hartlepool United alongside Colin Cooper.

Hignett left his role as assistant to then Hartlepool United boss Colin Cooper in March 2014 to join Aitor Karanka's revolution at Middlesbrough.
On 2 December 2014, Middlesbrough FC announced that Hignett had parted company with the club. The statement explained that, "Following discussions between Craig, Head Coach Aitor Karanka, and the club, all parties have agreed for Craig to leave his position with immediate effect."

Hignett was widely praised for having a hugely influential role in the upturns of Boro's fortunes, which has seen them challenging for promotion this season.

In February 2016, Hignett was appointed first-team manager of Hartlepool United following the departure of Ronnie Moore. His first game as Pools boss came in a 2–1 home win against Yeovil Town. Hignett's arrival saw an upturn in form and a run of seven wins from eleven games during March and April saw Hartlepool rise from 22nd to a respectable finishing position of 16th in League Two.

Hignett's start to the 2016–17 season was solid if unspectacular. While Hartlepool lost just two of their opening twelve league games, they hadn't won a home game and had drawn six. October was an especially disappointing month for the team, surrendering seven points from winning positions, the most notable of which being throwing away a two-goal lead to lose 3–2 defeat at Barnet. Hartlepool's form never recovered and after a run of just twelve points from fifteen games, he was sacked on 15 January 2017 following a 1–0 defeat at Crawley Town.

Hignett returned to Hartlepool in March 2018 as the club's Director of Football. Following the dismissal of Matthew Bates in November 2018, Hignett took temporary charge of the first team in addition to his role as director of football. Although former Luton boss Richard Money took charge in December 2018, he was later moved to a senior position before departing and Hignett was reinstated as first-team manager on 23 January 2019.

On 10 October 2019 Hignett was sacked alongside coach Ged McNamee, his dismissal was viewed with surprise from fans.

Managerial statistics

Personal life

In June 2013, Craig Hignett joined former footballer Colin Cooper and Sky Sports presenter Jeff Stelling and 12 other intrepid explorers to climb the 5,895m summit of Africa's highest mountain, Mount Kilimanjaro, to raise vital cash for the Finlay Cooper Fund in aid of children's charities.

Honours
Middlesbrough
Football League First Division: 1994–95; runner-up: 1997–98
FA Cup runner-up: 1996–97
League Cup runner-up: 1996–97

Blackburn Rovers
League Cup: 2001–02

Individual
PFA Team of the Year: 1999–2000 First Division

References

Sources

External links

1970 births
Living people
Aberdeen F.C. players
Apollon Limassol FC players
Barnsley F.C. players
Blackburn Rovers F.C. players
Coventry City F.C. players
Crewe Alexandra F.C. players
Darlington F.C. players
English footballers
English expatriate footballers
Association football midfielders
Association football forwards
Hartlepool United F.C. players
Billingham Synthonia F.C. players
Leicester City F.C. players
Liverpool F.C. players
Leeds United F.C. players
Middlesbrough F.C. non-playing staff
Middlesbrough F.C. players
Premier League players
English Football League players
Cypriot First Division players
Scottish Premier League players
Expatriate footballers in Cyprus
People from Whiston, Merseyside
Spennymoor United F.C. players
Hartlepool United F.C. non-playing staff
Hartlepool United F.C. managers
English football managers
FA Cup Final players